Mehmet Murat Uçar (born 1 August 1991) is a Turkish professional footballer who plays as a rightback for Eyüpspor.

Career
A youth product of Pendikspor, Uçar was promoted to their senior team in 2009 and from there went on loan to Beylerbeyi. He transferred to Beylerbeyi after his loan ended, and from there spent his early career with semi-pro clubs Sivas Belediyespor and Aydınspor. In January 2016, he signed a professional contract with Eskişehirspor. Uçar made his professional debut with Eskişehirspor in a 2-1 Süper Lig win over Sivasspor on 24 January 2016. He transferred to Altınordu in the TFF First League the following season, in 2017. On 18 July 2019, he signed with BB Erzurumspor and after a strong debut season, helped them get promoted into the Süper Lig for the 2020–21 season.

References

External links

1991 births
People from Muş
Living people
Turkish footballers
Association football fullbacks
Pendikspor footballers
Beylerbeyi S.K. footballers
Aydınspor footballers
Eskişehirspor footballers
Altınordu F.K. players
Büyükşehir Belediye Erzurumspor footballers
MKE Ankaragücü footballers
Eyüpspor footballers
Süper Lig players
TFF First League players
TFF Second League players
TFF Third League players